Saperda maculosa is a species of beetle in the family Cerambycidae. It was described by Édouard Ménétries in 1832. It is known from Iran.

References

maculosa
Beetles described in 1832